The following is a list of the largest cities in the Punjab region by population located in modern divisions which were part of the British Punjab Province as at 1947 when the modern countries of India and Pakistan were created. Accordingly, the Punjab is a geographical region in South Asia now divided politically by Pakistan and India and is also administratively divided into provinces, states, and territories within both countries. The former province is today part of Punjab, Haryana, Himachal Pradesh states and Chandigarh union territory in India, and Punjab province and Islamabad Capital Territory in Pakistan. This list deals with the areas within city administrative boundaries (city propers), urban areas, and metropolitan areas.

List of the Cities

See also
 List of most populous cities in Pakistan
 List of cities in Punjab and Chandigarh by population
List of cities in Punjab, Pakistan by population
 List of North Indian cities by population
 List of cities in India by population

References

Punjab
Punjab
Punjab
Punjabi language-related lists